Bornmuellera is a genus of flowering plants belonging to the family Brassicaceae.

Its native range is Southeastern Europe, Turkey.

Species:

Bornmuellera angustifolia 
Bornmuellera baldaccii 
Bornmuellera cappadocica 
Bornmuellera davisii 
Bornmuellera dieckii 
Bornmuellera emarginata 
Bornmuellera glabrescens 
Bornmuellera kiyakii 
Bornmuellera × petri 
Bornmuellera tymphaea

References

Brassicaceae
Brassicaceae genera